The 2016 Copa Luis Villarejo was the first edition of the Copa Luis Villarejo, a cup tournament for clubs in Puerto Rico organized by the Puerto Rican Football Federation. The champions and runners-up of this tournament are eligible to enter the 2017 Caribbean Club Championship, which serves as a qualifying tournament for the 2017 CONCACAF League and 2018 CONCACAF Champions League.

Teams
A total of eight teams participated in this tournament.
 Bayamón - LNF & PRSL
 Caguas Sporting - PRSL
 Criollos de Caguas - LNF
 Don Bosco - PRSL
 Guayama - LNF
 Metropolitan - PRSL
 Mayagüez - PRSL
 Puerto Rico FC - NASL

Bracket

First round

First legs

Second legs

Criollos de Caguas FC won 14–2 on aggregate.

Metropolitan FC won 5–3 on aggregate.

Bayamón FC won 8–0 on aggregate.

Puerto Rico FC won 6–0 on aggregate.

Semi-finals

First legs

Second legs

Criollos de Caguas FC won 5–4 on aggregate.

Puerto Rico FC won 4–0 on aggregate.

Final

Top goalscorers

References

External links
Federación Puertorriqueña de Fútbol
Copa Luis Villarejo Facebook page

Football competitions in Puerto Rico
2016 domestic association football cups
2016–17 in Caribbean football leagues
2016 in Puerto Rican football